Fatyanovo is a rural locality (a village) in Klyazminskoye Rural Settlement, Kovrovsky District, Vladimir Oblast, Russia. The population was 4 as of 2010.

Geography 
Fatyanovo is located 45 km east of Kovrov (the district's administrative centre) by road. Seltso is the nearest rural locality.

See also
 Fatyanovo-Balanovo culture

References 

Rural localities in Kovrovsky District